Coleophora petraea is a moth of the family Coleophoridae. It is found in Uzbekistan.

The larvae feed on the leaves of Arbuscula arbusculiformis. They create a leafy, tubular, straight or slightly curved case, consisting of two to four pieces of different sizes. The valve is three-sided.  The length of the case is 8–12 mm and the color is dark chocolate-brown, sometimes with a greenish tinge. Larvae can be found from the end of April to May and again from the end of July to August in at least two generations. Fully fed larvae hibernate.

References

petraea
Moths of Asia
Moths described in 1972